Coonagh may refer to
 Coonagh, Limerick City, bordering County Clare
 Coonagh Aerodrome
 Coonagh (barony), County Limerick, bordering County Tipperary